William Sampson may refer to:

 William Sampson (author) (1959–2012), a Canadian/British citizen arrested and tortured by the Saudi government between 2000 and 2003
 William Sampson (judge), Chief Justice of the Kentucky Supreme Court during the Civil War
 William Sampson (lawyer) (1764–1836), a United Irishmen lawyer exiled to the United States
 William Sampson (playwright)  (1590?–1636?), collaborated with Gervase Markham
 William Harkness Sampson, Methodist minister and educator, founder of Lawrence University
 William T. Sampson (1840–1902), American admiral and commander in the Spanish–American War

See also
 Will Sampson (1933–1987), a Native American actor and artist